Dadaneh Kamangar (also Romanized as Dādāneh Kamāngar and Dādāneh-ye Kamāngar; also known as Dadaneh, Dādāneh Kamāngīr, and Dowdāneh-ye Darrelah) is a village in Negel Rural District, Kalatrazan District, Sanandaj County, Kurdistan Province, Iran. At the 2006 census, its population was 341, in 81 families. The village is populated by Kurds.

References 

Towns and villages in Sanandaj County
Kurdish settlements in Kurdistan Province